is a passenger railway station in located in the city of Higashiōsaka,  Osaka Prefecture, Japan, operated by the private railway operator Kintetsu Railway.

Lines
Aramoto Station is served by the Keihanna Line, and is located 1.2 rail kilometers from the starting point of the line at Nagata Station and 19.1 kilometers from Cosmosquare Station.

Station layout
The station consists of one underground island platform.

Platforms

History
Aramoto Station opened on October 1, 1986

Passenger statistics
In fiscal 2018, the station was used by an average of 16,277 passengers daily.

Surrounding area
 Higashiōsaka City Hall
 Osaka Prefectural Central Library

See also
List of railway stations in Japan

References

External links

 Aramoto Station 

Railway stations in Osaka Prefecture
Stations of Kintetsu Railway
 Higashiōsaka